Deborah Froese (born 1957) is a Canadian Mennonite writer from Winnipeg, Manitoba.

Career 
Between 1979 and 1989, Froese worked as an audio-visual producer and photographer at VIP Communications Ltd. in Winnipeg. In 1994, she participated in the Manitoba Writers' Guild Mentorship Program, which led her toward writing; her first book, The Wise Washerman, was published two years later. From 2007 to 2017, Froese was Mennonite Church Canada's news services director. Between 2014 and 2017, she was an editorial director at Rebelight Publishing Incorporated, after which she became self-employed as a writer, editor, writing coach, and writing instructor.

Works

The Wise Washerman (1996) 
The Wise Washerman: A Folktale from Burma, illustrated by Wang Kui, was published October 1, 1996 by Hyperion Books.

The book received positive reviews from Publishers Weekly, School Library Journal, Canadian Children's Literature, and the Manitoba Library Association.

Publishers Weekly provided a positive review of the booking, highlighting its multicultural appeal by allowing readers to "get a taste of Burmese names and works, for which phonetic pronunciations are supplied parenthetically." They also complimented Kui's work, calling the illustrations "lavish," "extravagant," "almost-psychedelic,"  "[d]istinctive and imaginative." Writing for School Library Journal, Marilyn Larusso noted that "children old enough to appreciate trickery, cleverness, and justice will enjoy this tale." Canadian Children's Literature's Joanne Findon said the book was ""straightforward and lively" and "highlights the value of hard work in a lighthearted way." Harriet Zaid, Manitoba Library Association, noted that Froese "writes lyrically. Her gentle, formal style, using elevated language, evokes pictures of ancient ordered times."

The book won the Our Choice Award from the Canadian Children's Book Centre.

Out of the Fire (2002) 
Out of the Fire was published  January 1, 2002 by Turtleback Books. The book received a positive review from Booklist, as well as the following accolades:

 American Library Association's Best Books for Young Adults selection (2003)
 Canadian Library Association's Young Adult Canadian Book Award
 Manitoba Young Readers’ Choice Award Honor Certificate (2003)
 McNally Robinson Book of the Year Award for Young People

Out of the Fire was translated into German and published by Beltz & Gelberg. In 2005, it was shortlisted for the Deutschen Jugendliteraturpreis.

Publications

Articles in Canadian Mennonite 

 "Thelma Meade: 'I know where I go': An Aboriginal elder's experience with the church," in Vision: A Journal for Church and Theology (2010) 
 "What is the Spirit writing on our hearts?"  (2017)
 "It’s all about trust" (2017)
 "Meta-morphosis" (2017)
 "How to avoid ‘a tense faith’" (2017)
 "Mennonite helps Lutherans commemorate the Reformation" (2017)
 "Celebrating a legacy of respect" (2017)
 "A new song for Special Assembly 2017" (2017)
 "Supporting women’s education with a party and a quilt" (2017)
 "Canada 150: Facing the long divide" (2017)
 "Prosthetic limb leads to new hope for Syrian refugee" (2017)
 "Donations sought to send youth to special delegate assembly" (2017)
 "An idea worth sharing" (2017)
 "Film on COs wins awards and attention" (2016)
 "Assembly 2016 resolution about more than BDS" (2016)

Books 

 The Wise Washerman: A Folktale from Burma, illustrated by Wang Kui (1996)
 Out of the Fire (2002)
 Mr. Jacobson's Window (2014)

Personal 
Froese was born in Winnipeg in 1957 in and attended the University of Manitoba. She currently lives in Manitoba with her husband and three sons. They are members of First Mennonite Church of Winnipeg, where Froese teaches Sunday school classes.

References 

Living people
1957 births
University of Manitoba alumni
Canadian Mennonites
Mennonite writers
Writers from Winnipeg